Still Waiting for Spring is the fourth album by Matt Nathanson, released in March 1999 on Acrobat Records. It is the last independent release by Nathanson; he would later sign to Universal Records.

Track listing
"Parade" – 0:33
"Wings" – 2:53
"Lucky Boy" – 3:25
"Loud" – 3:44
"Answering Machine" – 3:50
"Then I'll Be Smiling" – 2:58
"More Than This" – 3:26
"Everything You Say Sounds Like Gospel" – 3:06
"Amazing Again" – 3:45
"Little Victories" – 2:35

References
 Matt Nathanson official site

1999 albums
Matt Nathanson albums